Campsicnemus is a genus of flies in family Dolichopodidae. There are more than 290 described species, made up of 34 Palearctic, 22 Nearctic, seven Afrotropic, 170 Australasian and Oceanian, and seven Indomalayan species. Some species endemic to the Hawaiian islands are characterized by their lack of wings. After the introduction of invasive ants and other alien species such as wild boar (Sus scrofa)  to the islands, some of these flightless species are believed extinct.

The generic name is derived from the Ancient Greek καμψις ("curve") and κνημη ("tibia"). This refers to the modified mid tibia of the males, a male secondary sexual character that is very distinct in Campsicnemus.

Gallery

See also
 List of Campsicnemus species

References

Dolichopodidae genera
Sympycninae
Articles containing video clips
Taxa named by Alexander Henry Haliday
Taxonomy articles created by Polbot